The 1962 World Wrestling Championships were held in Toledo, Ohio.

Medal table

Team ranking

Medal summary

Men's freestyle

Men's Greco-Roman

References
FILA Database

World Wrestling Championships
W
1962 in American sports
1962 in sport wrestling